This article attempts to list the oldest extant buildings in Bermuda.

See also 
Oldest buildings in the United States

References 

Oldest
Bermuda